Chamber Music Society is the third studio album by American bassist and singer Esperanza Spalding. It was released on August 17, 2010 by Heads Up International. After Spalding's Grammy win for Best New Artist, the album re-entered the Billboard 200 at number 34 with sales of 18,000.

A video was made for the song "Little Fly". The song is a poem by William Blake set to music by Spalding.

A vinyl version of the album was released in February 2011. This version of the album included a bonus track titled "Morning" which was to be included on her Radio Music Society album.

Chamber Music Society was the best-selling contemporary jazz album of 2011.

Critical reception

Bill Friskics-Warren of The Washington Post noted "The mood throughout the album's 11 tracks is languid and improvisatory, with Spalding and members of her chamber ensemble weaving in and out of roomy arrangements that afford them as much chance to linger on a note as to take off on flights of melodic or rhythmic fancy. Their fusion of jazz, contemporary classical and other sources, including some understated funk, is as lively as it is original". Will Layman of PopMatters commented, "2010 brings Spalding’s most ambitious and complex music yet. Chamber Music Society delivers more of what a fan would expect –sinuous singing, a flexible, modern, acoustic jazz trio at the center, Latin rhythms that shift through funk, swing, and Brazilian grooves, but always in service of tuneful soul — while adding some daring new elements as well."

Zachary Sniderman of Paste Magazine wrote "Spalding’s voice is the warm heart of Chamber Music Society. Her best songs are anchored by that core, despite some experimental slips into the jazz deep-end. Spalding does better carving out a soundscape than acting like a sonic bulldozer. Still, Chamber Music Society is a fresh, slender album that shows both Spalding’s immense talent and the heart within it". Mark Kemp of Rolling Stone added, "Chamber Music Society finds Spalding stretching herself a bit too thin... But her talent is undeniable."

Track listing 
All songs written and composed by Esperanza Spalding, except where noted.
 "Little Fly" (lyrics: William Blake, music: Esperanza Spalding) – 3:33
 "Knowledge of Good and Evil" – 7:59
 "Really Very Small" – 2:44
 "Chacarera" (Leo Genovese) – 7:27
 "Wild Is the Wind" (Dimitri Tiomkin, Ned Washington) – 5:37
 "Apple Blossom" – 6:02
 "As a Sprout" – 0:41
 "What a Friend" – 4:54
 "Winter Sun" – 6:48
 "Inútil Paisagem" (lyrics: Aloísio de Oliveira, music: Antonio Carlos Jobim) – 4:38
 "Short and Sweet" – 5:52

Personnel 
 Esperanza Spalding – bass guitar, double bass, vocals
 Leo Genovese – piano, electric piano, melodica
 Terri Lyne Carrington – drums
 Quintino Cinalli – percussion
 Entcho Todorov – violin
 Lois Martin – viola
 David Eggar – cello
 Ricardo Vogt – nylon-stringed guitar on "Apple Blossom"
 Milton Nascimento – guest vocals on "Apple Blossom"
 Gretchen Parlato – backing vocals on "Inútil Paisagem" and "Knowledge of Good and Evil"
 Gil Goldstein – co-arranger

Charts

References 

2010 albums
Esperanza Spalding albums
Heads Up International albums